Aleksandar Isaevski (born 19 May 1995) is a Macedonian professional footballer who plays as a defender for Dinamo Tirana in the Superliga 1 of Albania.

Club career
Isaevski grew up in the United States and played college soccer for the SVSU Cardinals. In March 2014, he joined Detroit City from Saginaw Valley State University. His performances at Detroit City FC led him to play in the Macedonian 1st Division, starting off at Makedonija GP. After one season, Isaevski signed for higher ranked Macedonian side FK Pobeda. His strong defensive talent attracted teams from the Bulgarian 1st League. Isaevski joined Bulgarian side Dunav on 18 January 2019. He significantly helped his side stay within safety of relegation by providing one of the top assists that led Dunav Ruse to victory within the relegation playoff. With this victory, Dunav Ruse remained amongst the teams of Bulgaria's top league for the following season. Isaevski was also named amongst the top 11 players of the week and month for his superb performances. This eventually attracted FK Villaznia Shkodër to sign him amongst the Albanian Superliga. Within his first season with the Albanian giants, Isaevski helped his team win the Albanian Cup and narrowly finish as runner-up in the Albanian Superliga of 2021. The decider was a narrow goal differential which saw Villaznia finish in 2nd despite being tied for 1st on points. Isaevski is set to play in the Albanian Super Cup where his Villaznia side will play the current champions of the 1st league.

Honours & Awards
Vllaznia Shkodër
  Albanian Cup (1): 2021 
  Albanian Superliga (1): 2021

Individual 
Dunav Ruse
 Top 11 Players of the Month (Bulgarian 1st League)

References

External links
Player Profile at Soccerway

1995 births
Living people
Footballers from Skopje
Macedonian footballers
Macedonian expatriate footballers
Association football fullbacks
Saginaw Valley State Cardinals men's soccer players
Detroit City FC players
FK Makedonija Gjorče Petrov players
FK Pobeda players
FC Dunav Ruse players
KF Vllaznia Shkodër players
Macedonian First Football League players
First Professional Football League (Bulgaria) players
Kategoria Superiore players
Expatriate soccer players in the United States
Macedonian expatriate sportspeople in the United States
Expatriate footballers in Bulgaria
Macedonian expatriate sportspeople in Bulgaria